Harold James Hughes (8 October 1929 - 15 October 2013) was an English professional footballer. His clubs included Chelsea, Bournemouth & Boscombe Athletic and Gillingham, where he made over 200 Football League appearances. He was captain of the Bournemouth team that knocked out Wolverhampton Wanderers and Tottenham Hotspur before losing to Manchester United in the quarter-finals of the FA Cup in 1957.

References

1929 births
Sportspeople from Nuneaton
2013 deaths
Association football defenders
English footballers
Southport F.C. players
Chelsea F.C. players
AFC Bournemouth players
Gillingham F.C. players
Guildford City F.C. players
English Football League players